The 2009–10 season of the Portuguese Futsal First Division is the 20th season of top-tier futsal in Portugal.

League table

Note: Round 16: Mogadouro - Onze Unidos was suspended due to incidents between players in the pitch. The game was declared lost for both clubs (0-3)

Title playoffs

Extra Time = *

See also
Futsal in Portugal

References

External links
Championship Play-Off

Futsal
Portuguese Futsal First Division seasons
Portugal